Azman Air Services Limited is a Nigerian based domestic airline company. Established in 2010 by businessman Abdulmunaf Yunusa Sarina, the airline operates scheduled domestic passenger services with its main base in Mallam Aminu Kano International Airport, Kano.

History
Azman Air was established in 2010, and began operations in 2014 with its first commercial flight to Nnamdi Azikiwe International Airport, on 15 May 2014 from Kano. The airline began operations in Nigeria with 2 Boeing 737-500 aircraft for its domestic services. In October 2017, Azman Air leased a used Airbus A330 from an Egyptian charter airline (the now defunct Air Leisure) which would be used to fly to international routes to both the Middle East and Asia. The airline has since discontinued leasing the A330, and, as of 8 February 2020, is only flying domestic routes within Nigeria.

Destinations 

As of February 2020, Azman Air operates services to the following scheduled destinations:

Abuja - Nnamdi Azikiwe International Airport
Asaba - Asaba International Airport
Benin City - Benin Airport
Birnin Kebbi - Sir Ahmadu Bello International Airport
Gombe - Gombe Lawanti International Airport
Kaduna - Kaduna International Airport
Kano - Mallam Aminu Kano International Airport Hub
Lagos - Murtala Muhammed International Airport
Maiduguri - Maiduguri International Airport
Owerri - Sam Mbakwe Airport
Port Harcourt - Port Harcourt International Airport
Dakar - Blaise Diagne International Airport
Jeddah - King Abdulaziz International Airport

Fleet

Current fleet

As of February 2020, the Azman Air fleet consists of the following aircraft:

Former fleet
In 2017, the airline operated a leased Airbus A330-200.

In-flight services
Azman Air Services Limited launches its first in-flight quarterly magazine titled Fly Safe Magazine on August 15, 2020. The magazine was released after the resumption of domestic operations in Nigeria. It was first sighted in the airline's headquarters as free copies were shared among staff and passengers. Fly Safe Magazine is published by the Nigerian company Zamkah Technologies Limited.

Incidents and accidents
On 17 February 2021, an Azman Air Boeing 737-500 with registration number 5N-SYS named Sani Yunusa Sarina with over 100 passengers coming from Abuja suffered a burst tyre on landing at Murtala Muhammed International Airport in Lagos. No casualties were reported.

Suspension from service
On 17 March 2021, the management of Azman Air announced the suspension of its flight services to all destinations in Nigeria. According to the Nigerian Civil Aviation Authority (NCAA), the suspension was to enable the regulatory authority to conduct an audit of the airline to determine the root causes of the previous incidents to the airline and recommend corrective actions.

References

External links 

Official website

Airlines established in 2014
Nigerian companies established in 2014
Organizations based in Kano
Airlines of Nigeria
Transport in Kano